"Not Like That" is a song recorded by American singer Ashley Tisdale for her 2007 debut album, Headstrong. "Not Like That" was released as the album's third single on January 25, 2008, in Europe. The single was later released in Chile and Brazil, in April and August 2008, respectively. "Not Like That" was Tisdale's first single to not be released in North America. The single had a physical release in Europe and Chile, with two editions of the single being released, with different track listings and remixes. Lyrically the song deals with life in the entertainment business.

The song received a generally positive reception from music critics. Commercially, the song became another hit for Tisdale in Germany, where her previous single, "He Said She Said" had entered the top 20. The song also became her second top 40 hit in Austria, and had success in Sweden as well. Tisdale performed the song on the set of Good Morning America, after performing her previous singles "Be Good to Me" and "He Said She Said". The performance was not broadcast, however, and was only available for the studio audience. Tisdale also performed the song on Live With Regis and Kelly, with part of the performance being broadcast. The song was also performed on Tisdale's "Headstrong Tour Across America".

Background and composition

"Not Like That" features several different writers, including David Jassy, Joacim Person, Nicolas Molinder and Tisdale herself. Twin also serves as the producers of the song, while Victoria Sandstrom provides backing vocals. The song was recorded in 2006, along with the majority of Tisdale's debut album. During an interview with MTV in March 2007, Tisdale confirmed the song would be the album's third single. The album was released as a physical CD in Europe on January 25, 2008, slightly over a year after Tisdale's previous single, "He Said She Said" was released. The physical copy of the single came in two version. The maxi CD single featured the album version of the song, along with the Jack D. Elliot remixes of both "He Said She Said" and "Be Good to Me". The music video for "Not Like That" is also included. The second CD single features the album version of "Not Like That", and the Jack D. Elliot remix of "Be Good to Me".

Tisdale said that the song is about "how people often see the glamorous side of this career [...] It's really saying it's not like that and I'm just the girl next door. There's always somebody who either loves you or hates you, and you just have to have a thick skin". "Not Like That," which contains influences of Middle Eastern music, covers the topic of the "familiar misunderstood-celebrity," but was referred to as more "worked up" than "whiny." Containing rap interludes by Tisdale and clap along beats, according to Gary Graff of Billboard, the song is also liking to Gwen Stefani.

Reception
Jamie Ross of Arizona Daily Wildcat said "Tisdale hits the right note with the out-of-this-world song "Not Like That." The up-tempo number features clap-along beats, white girl rhymes and lyrics every girl who has ever been to a club can relate to. Commercially, the song became another hit for Tisdale in Germany, where her previous single, "He Said She Said" had entered the top 20. The song also became her second top 40 hit in Austria, and had success in Sweden as well.

Music video
The music video was leaked on October 2, 2007. It is the second part of the There's Something About Ashley DVD. The music video intro features Tisdale's sister Jennifer Tisdale. The video was directed by Scott Speer. The music video starts with Tisdale to read a magazine that a friend gives her. The magazine's cover story is about Tisdale. We see her in her room singing, at work—filming a commercial—and in a magazine. Josh Henderson, Scott Speer, and Jared Murillo, make cameos in the video.

Track listings
Maxi CD single

 "Not Like That"  – 3:01
 "He Said She Said"  – 3:05
 "Be Good to Me"  – 6:17
 "Not Like That"  – 3:10

2-tracks CD single

 "Not Like That"  – 3:01
 "Be Good to Me"  – 6:17

Charts

Release history

Credits and personnel
Lead vocals – Ashley Tisdale, David Jassy
Producer – Twin
Vocal producer – Twin
Writer (s) – Ashley Tisdale, David Jassy, Nicolas Molinder, Pell Ankarberg, Joacim Person
Mixer and additional programming – Alan Mason
Background vocals – Victoria Sandstrom

Covers and samples
Indonesian singer Vicky Shu sampled the music of the song for her single "Mari Bercinta", translating to "Let's Have Sex". The song was featured on her album Drink Me, and was released on October 11, 2010.

References

2007 songs
2008 singles
Ashley Tisdale songs
Dance-pop songs
Music videos directed by Scott Speer
Songs written by David Jassy
Songs written by Niclas Molinder
Songs written by Joacim Persson
Song recordings produced by Twin (production team)
Songs written by Ashley Tisdale
Warner Records singles